Joseph Hughes may refer to:

 Joseph Hughes (footballer) (1891–1966), English footballer
 Joseph Hughes (GC) (died 1946), recipient of the George Cross
 Joseph Hughes (musician), former member of The Flys and The Lover Speaks
 Joseph Hughes (politician) (1905–1960), Irish Fine Gael politician
 Joseph Henry Hughes (1857–1917), Canadian politician
 Joseph "Joe" Hughes, suspect in the point-and-click adventure game, Nancy Drew: The Final Scene

See also
Joe Hughes (disambiguation)
Hughes (surname)